Vito van Crooij (born 29 January 1996) is a Dutch professional footballer who plays as a winger, primarily on the left hand side, for Sparta Rotterdam in the Eredivisie. He won the Eerste Divisie Young Player of the Year in 2016 for his performances for VVV-Venlo. 

His brother, Delano van Crooy plays professionally as a goalkeeper.

Club career
Born in Venlo, van Crooij made his debut for VVV-Venlo at the age of 18 in the KNVB Cup against Eindhoven at the start of the 2014–15 Season, however he did not score until the game against MVV in the KNVB Cup, scoring once in the 2–0 victory. His first league game in the Eerste Divisie was in the 3–0 victory against Achilles '29. However, Van Crooy did not score a league goal until February, netting the winner in the 1–0 victory against Almere City.

In the 2015–16 season, van Crooij was part of the VVV-Venlo squad which finished second in the Eerste Divisie. He scored 13 goals and recorded 8 assists throughout the season playing as a left winger. He was part of the VVV-Venlo team which lost in the play off final of the Eerste Divisie. He just missed out on the Eerste Divisie Young Player of the Year Award for the 2015–16 season where he was nominated due to his impressive performances for VVV.

In the 2016–17 season, van Crooij started the season well, scoring the equaliser in the 2–1 victory over SC Cambuur. Since then he has scored more goals, including a penalty in the 2–1 defeat to Helmond Sport.

On 13 July 2018 he became a new PEC Zwolle player.

On 25 August 2020, he returned to VVV-Venlo.

On 25 June 2021, Van Crooij signed a three-year contract with Sparta Rotterdam. On 14 August 2022, he scored the fastest goal in Eredivisie history – after eight seconds against AZ Alkmaar.

Career statistics

Honours
VVV-Venlo
 Eerste Divisie: 2016–17

References

External links
 
 Voetbal International profile 
 Netherlands profile at Ons Oranje

1996 births
Living people
Association football wingers
Dutch footballers
Netherlands youth international footballers
Netherlands under-21 international footballers
VVV-Venlo players
PEC Zwolle players
Sparta Rotterdam players
Eredivisie players
Eerste Divisie players
Footballers from Venlo